= Craig Bland =

American politician (born 1959)

Member of the Missouri House of Representatives from the 43rd district
- In office 2001 – January 7, 2009
- Preceded by: Terry Riley
- Succeeded by: Roman Lee LeBlanc

Personal details
- Born: May 5, 1959 (age 67) Kansas City, Missouri
- Party: Democratic

Craig Bland (born May 5, 1959) is an American politician who served in the Missouri House of Representatives from the 43rd district from 2001 to 2009.
